Police brutality is the abuse of authority by the unwarranted infliction of excessive force by personnel involved in law enforcement while performing their official duties. Police brutality can also include psychological harm through the use of intimidation tactics beyond the scope of officially sanctioned police procedure.  In the United States, Native Americans (also known as American Indians) experience disproportionately high amounts of violence from law enforcement.

Prevalence 
Native Americans ages 20–24, 25–34, and 35–44 are three of the five groups most likely to be killed by police. In her book Silent Victims: Hate Crimes Against Native Americans, Barbara Perry interviewees frequently reported "police misconduct … running the continuum from negligence to extreme forms of violence." She concluded that, "they can neither trust the police to respect their rights, nor to protect them when others violate their rights."

Causes 
Police brutality is often associated with Black People are worse on the scale of racial profiling. When differences in race, religion, or socioeconomic status exist between police and the citizenry, some police officers may view the population (or a particular subset thereof) as generally deserving of punishment. Portions of the population may perceive the police to be oppressors. A 2001 study found that 30% of Native Americans agreed with the suggestion that police officers are honest (compared to 57% of whites and 15% of Black/African-Americans). In addition, there is a perception that victims of police brutality often belong to relatively powerless groups, such as racial or cultural minorities, the disabled, and the poor. The issue of police brutality against Native Americans has deeply-rooted, historic causes.

Native Americans experience psychological distress such as depression and PTSD more than twice as often as the general population. Access to mental health services for Native Americans is limited. As first respondents, police officers are often the ones who decide whether or not a person with a mental illness who is posing a threat to self or others is sent into the health care system or the criminal justice system. However officers receive a limited amount of psychiatric training and are not prepared to deal with those experiencing mental health crises. Only specialized mobile crisis teams, which are not present in all jurisdictions, are provided training on how to recognize and handle psychotic behavior as well as how to provide access to resources to someone who may be threatening violence or suicide. Intervention by police officers who are not trained or in jurisdictions where a specialized team is not available is less effective. One-fourth of people killed by police from January to June in 2016 were experiencing a mental health crisis. Native Americans made up half of those deaths.

The low proportion of Native Americans in the United States may contribute to a lack of media attention for cases of police brutality against them. This is affected by the portion of Native Americans living on reservations, as one fifth of the population lives on reservations in the Midwest; however, media presence on reservations is low, which results in instances of police brutality against Native Americans going unrecorded.

Effects 
Native Americans are also incarcerated at disproportionately high rates. Native American men are admitted to prison at 4 times the rate of white men, and Native American women are admitted at 6 times the rate of white women. The number of Native Americans confined in jail is 4 times the national average and the number, per capita, confined to federal prisons is 38% above the national average. Native American youth are also highly affected. 1% of United States youth are Native American, yet Native American youth make up 70% of youth committed to the Federal Bureau Prisons. Native American juveniles are also transferred to the adult system at 18.1 times the rate of white juveniles.

Specific cases

Individuals 

In January 1994, two Native American men were arrested by Minneapolis police and they were placed in the trunk of a squad car. One man sustained injuries when the trunk was closed on his leg. Both men filed a lawsuit against the city of Minneapolis and each received $100,000.

On November 15, 1997, a Native American man, arrested for public intoxication, was handcuffed, sprayed with a chemical irritant, and verbally assaulted by two Minneapolis officers. The man was then driven to the city line and left in the snow, with only a light jacket. The man received a settlement of $92,500 after filing a police brutality lawsuit.

In April 2000, complaints were filed with the Bureau of Indian affairs, accusing the Wagner, South Dakota Police Chief of using excessive force in the arrest of a Native American woman. The chief allegedly threw the woman to the ground and yanked her up by the cuffs, cutting her wrists. The chief was not indicted and the case was closed in November 2000.

On June 29, 2002, 20-year-old Joseph Finley Jr., who was Cherokee and Seminole, was shot fourteen times by a Cleveland police officer. The officer was off-duty at the time of the shooting and an excessive force lawsuit was filed. While the officer was not indicted, Finley's father received a settlement of $35,000 from the state.

On March 27, 2016, a Navajo woman, Loreal Tsingine, was shot in Winslow, Arizona, by a police officer. The officer was responding to a report of shoplifting and when Tsingine threatened him with scissors, he shot her five times. Tsingine's family filed a notice of claim against the city, alleging that the city ignored warning signs that the officer involved was a threat, due to a history of police misconduct. The officer responsible resigned in October 2016.

Standing Rock 

On November 20, 2016, instances of police brutality took place near the Standing Rock Sioux Reservation, where members of the Oceti Šakowiŋ tribe and allies were protesting the construction of the Dakota Access Pipeline. A lawsuit was filed against Morton County; Morton County's Sheriff; the city of Mandan, North Dakota; Mandan's Police Chief; Stutsman County; and Stutsman County's Sheriff, alleging that an unjustified violent attack took place against peaceful protesters. The legal collective representing the Native Americans alleges that the use of "Specialty Impact Munitions, explosive blast grenades, other chemical agent devices, and water cannons and water hoses in freezing temperatures" is excessive force. Numerous protesters were injured, resulting in the hospitalization of over two dozen individuals. In January 2017, militarized officers used tear gas and rubber bullets against unarmed protestors. United Nations Special Rapporteur Maini Kiai told the United Nations that the detention of the protestors was inhumane because of over-crowding and no access to medical care.

Advocacy

Native Lives Matter  
The Native Lives Matter campaign was established in 2014 by Akicita Sunka-Wakan Ska (Troy Amlee) from the Cheyenne River and Standing Rock Sioux Tribes and JR Bobick from St. Paul, Minnesota. The goal of the campaign is to bring social issues affecting Native Americans, such as police brutality, poverty, and mental health, into a national dialogue and rally for social justice reform. The campaign uses social media platforms Facebook and Twitter to spread news about social justice issues Native Americans are facing as well as to build a community.

According to the movement, ways to lessen and eventually cease police brutality against Native Americans include hiring a police force that better represents its service population in counties with a dense Native American population. This would allow for more cultural understanding and address racial issues that lead to police brutality. Cultural healing programs would also lessen police brutality by addressing issues such as mental health, addiction, and poverty, as these things contribute to the high crime rates of reservations and police presence. These programs would require a reallocation of government resources.

See also 
Native Americans and the prison–industrial complex
Police brutality in the United States
Police use of deadly force in the United States
Saskatoon freezing deaths

References 

Police brutality in the United States
Anti-indigenous racism in the United States
Violence against indigenous peoples
Native American topics
Law enforcement controversies in the United States
Race-related controversies in the United States
Native American-related controversies